Jean-Paul Kauffmann (8 August 1944, Saint-Pierre-la-Cour, Mayenne) is a French journalist and writer, a former student of the École supérieure de journalisme de Lille (40th class).

Biography 
His great-grandfather Michel Kauffmann left Alsace in 1871 after the Treaty of Frankfurt and settled in the region of Vitré. Jean-Paul Kauffmann was born at Saint-Pierre-la-Cour 
but when he was nine months old, his parents moved to Corps-Nuds, in Ille-et-Vilaine, to take over a bakery. He entered as a boarder in a religious college at age 11. Unhappy during these "overwhelming years", he took refuge in reading the works of Balzac, Stendhal and above all, Jean de La Fontaine. Due to his love of literature, he believed he had the vocation of a journalist and studied at the École supérieure de journalisme de Lille between 1962 and 1966. He did his military service as a cooperant in an educational service in Quebec. He extended his stay there by working in a weekly supplement in the Montreal press. Assistant to the Quiet Revolution, he dreamed of staying permanently in the country after falling in love with Mara, a bookseller from Latvia, as he recalls in his narrative Courlande.

Hostage in Lebanon 
Returning to France in 1970, he was employed as a journalist for Radio France Internationale for seven years, then to AFP. While his magazine sent him to Lebanon, he was abducted in Beirut with sociologist Michel Seurat on 22 May 1985. His wife  was actively committed to his release which happened on 4 May 1988 with other hostages, through the intervention of Jean-Charles Marchiani, while Jacques Chirac was Prime minister of François Mitterrand. Michel Seurat, for his part, died in custody in 1986. 
On the occasion of this abduction, Jean-Paul Kauffman lived the traumatic experience of traveling on several occasions, wrapped in an Oriental carpet where asphyxia caused him to lose consciousness, which led him to deepen his reflection and strongly marked his life:

Writer 
In 1994, Jean-Paul Kauffmann created the magazine L'Amateur de cigare.

As a writer, he published L' (1993) which earned the Prix Jean-Freustié, then La Chambre noire de Longwood : le voyage à Sainte-Hélène (1997) which was awarded numerous prizes (prix Roger Nimier, Grand Prix Lire-RTL, Prix Jules-Verne,  prix Joseph-Kessel and ) ; La Lutte avec l'Ange (2001) and 31, allées Damour - Raymond Guérin 1905-1955 (2004). All these books have a common theme: enclosure, but never directly evoke his experience as a hostage.

In 2002, Jean-Paul Kauffmann received the Grand prix de littérature Paul-Morand awarded by the Académie française.

For the first time in 2007, in La Maison du retour (2007), he evokes his captivity, his situation as a hostage and the moments which followed his return; the painful relearning of a "normal" life; his inability to read, for him the great literature enthusiast. As in all Jean-Paul Kauffmann's books, everything is written, in a subdued tone: through the story of buying a house, a den or an airlock, so as to be able to return to his family and to life.

A lover of Bordeaux wines, he has published several books on the subject.

With Courlande (Fayard, 2009), the story of a journey sets the plot of several quests, including that of the identity of a country, Courland.

He was awarded the Prix de la langue française in 2009 for all his work.

Publications 
1989: Voyage à Bordeaux, photographs by Michel Guillard, Caisse des dépôts et consignations
1989: Le Bordeaux retrouvé (excluding trade)
1992: L'Arche des Kerguelen : voyages aux îles de la désolation, Flammarion, prix Jean-Freustié
1997: La Chambre noire de Longwood : le voyage à Sainte-Hélène, La Table Ronde, prix Roger Nimier , prix Joseph Kessel, .
 2000: The Dark Room at Longwood, .
1997: L'Œil originel, photographs by Frédéric Desmesure, published on the occasion of the 9th Salon Vinexpo and the exhibition "Regards du monde", Bordeaux, Parc des expositions, 16–20 June 1997, 
1997: Postface to Mes grands Bordeaux, by Pierre-Jean Rémy, Albin Michel
1999: La Morale d'Yquem : conversations with Alexandre de Lur Saluces, Mollat-Grasset
2001: La Lutte avec l'Ange, La Table Ronde, 
2003: Preface to L'Âme du vin (1932), by Maurice Constantin-Weyer, La Table Ronde
2004: 31, allées Damour : Raymond Guérin, 1905-1955, Berg International-La Table Ronde
2007: La Maison du retour, NiL Éditions, Prix Bretagne 2007
2007: Preface to 5 rue des Italiens. Chroniques du Monde, by Bernard Frank, Grasset
2009: Courlande, Fayard, 
2010: Preface to Château La Louvière. Le bel art du vin, by Hélène Brun-Puginier, La Martinière
2011: Voyage à Bordeaux 1989, edition revised and corrected by the author, Éditions des Équateurs, "Parallèles"
2011: Voyage en Champagne 1990, edition revised and corrected by the author, Éditions des Équateurs, "Parallèles"
2013: Remonter la Marne, Fayard
2016: Outre-Terre, Éditions des Équateurs
2019: Venise à double tour; Éditions des Équateurs

References

External links 

 Jean-Paul Kauffmann on France Culture
 Kauffmann, père et fils on L'Express (1/5/2009) 
 Otage pendant trois ans au Liban, Jean-Paul Kauffmann a survécu grâce à une Bible on La Croix (17/01/2014)
 Jean-Paul Kauffmann on France Inter

20th-century French journalists
21st-century French journalists
20th-century French writers
21st-century French writers
French war correspondents
Joseph Kessel Prize recipients
Roger Nimier Prize winners
Prix Jean Freustié winners
1944 births
People from Mayenne
Living people